In statistics, combinatorial data analysis (CDA) is the study of data sets where the order in which objects are arranged is important. CDA can be used either to determine how well a given combinatorial construct reflects the observed data, or to search for a suitable combinatorial construct that does fit the data.

See also
Cluster analysis
Geometric data analysis
Structured data analysis (statistics)
Seriation (statistics)

References

Combinatorics
Data analysis
Combinatorial optimization